Cylindropuntia prolifera, known by the common name Coastal cholla, is a species of cactus. In Australia it is called 'Jumping Cholla' because of it seeming to jump from outbreak to outbreak.

Description
Cylindropuntia prolifera is a mostly erect, treelike cactus which can approach 3 meters in maximum height. The gray-green segments are narrow and cylindrical, surfaced in fleshy tubercles bearing many brown or reddish spines up to 2 centimeters long. The flowers are reddish purple and often borne on the fruits of previous seasons. Fruits grow in chains of up to 5 and are green in color.

Distribution
Cylindropuntia prolifera is native to Southern California and Baja California, where it grows in coastal sage scrub, chaparral, and beach and bluff habitat. It occurs from Santa Barbara County south.

In parts of Australia, Cylindropuntia prolifera could be used as a case study in invasive species.

It was introduced as a plant that looks after itself and doesn't need water. While they don't seem to flower as prolifically as the literature might suggest, they spread by stem segments breaking off and travelling on the fur and feet of animals, at times crippling or killing them, or on car tyres. Once dropped, the segments can survive many months until rain stimulates rooting.

Chemical control is resource intensive, and in steep mountainous areas it is not only resource intensive, but dangerous. Cochineal beetles are being trialed for various ~opuntia genera. For Cylindropuntia prolifera they kill infected plants, but do not spread well, and so as new outbreaks are discovered, knobs of infected plants are manually transported to that site.

See also
California coastal sage and chaparral - (subecoregion)

External links
Cylindropuntia prolifera photo gallery at Cholla Web
Jepson Manual Treatment - Cylindropuntia prolifera
USDA Plants Profile: Cylindropuntia prolifera
Flora of North America

References

prolifera
Cacti of Mexico
Cacti of the United States
Flora of Baja California
Flora of California
Natural history of the California chaparral and woodlands
Natural history of the Channel Islands of California
Natural history of the Peninsular Ranges
Natural history of the Santa Monica Mountains
~
Flora without expected TNC conservation status